Ernest Ward (30 July 1920 – 9 July 1987) was an English rugby league footballer who played in the 1940s and 1950s, and coached in the 1950s. Ernest Ward was a Private in the British Army during World War II.

Background
Ward was born in Dewsbury, West Riding of Yorkshire, England, and he lived in a bungalow in Wyke, Bradford.

Playing career

Bradford Northern
Ernest Ward made 391 appearances for Bradford Northern, scoring 117 tries and 538 goals, for a total of 1427 points, he was inducted into the Bradford Northern/Bradford Bulls Hall of Fame in September 2006.

International honours
Ernest Ward won caps for England while at Bradford Northern in 1941 against Wales, in 1945 against Wales (2 matches), in 1946 against France (2 matches), and Wales (2 matches), in 1947 against France, and Wales, in 1948 against France (2 matches), in 1949 against Wales, and France (2 matches), in 1950 against Wales (2 matches), and France, in 1952 against Other Nationalities (2 matches), and Wales, won caps for Wales while at Bradford Northern in 1946 against France, in 1947 against France, England, New Zealand, France, and England, in 1948 against France, England, France, and Australia, in 1949 against England, and France, and in 1951 against Other Nationalities (2 matches), represented British Empire while at Bradford Northern in 1952 against New Zealand, and won caps for Great Britain while at Bradford Northern in 1946 against Australia (3 matches), and New Zealand, in 1947 against New Zealand (2 matches), in 1948 against Australia (3 matches), in 1950 against Australia (3 matches), and New Zealand (2 matches), in 1951 against New Zealand (3 matches), and in 1952 against Australia (3 matches).

As of September 2010, With 26 goals, Ernest Ward is fourth in the list of England's all-time Goal Scorers, behind George Fairbairn, Andrew Farrell & Kevin Sinfield, with 58 points he is 4th in the list of England's all-time Point Scorers, again behind George Fairbairn, Andrew Farrell & Kevin Sinfield.

Championship final appearances
Ernest Ward played in Bradford Northern's 26-20 aggregate victory over Halifax in the Championship Final during the 1944–45 season; the 2–9 defeat at Thrum Hall, Halifax, and the 24–11 victory at Odsal Stadium, Bradford.

Challenge Cup Final appearances
Ernest Ward played in Bradford Northern's 8-3 aggregate victory over Wigan in the 1943–44 Challenge Cup Final during the 1943–44 season; the 0–3 defeat at Central Park, Wigan on Saturday 15 April 1944, and the 8–0 victory at Odsal Stadium, Bradford on Saturday 22 April 1944, played and scored 2 conversions in the 8–4 victory over Leeds in the 1946–47 Challenge Cup Final during the 1946–47 season at Wembley Stadium, London on Saturday 3 May 1947, played left-, i.e. number 4, and was captain in the 3–8 defeat by Wigan in the 1947–48 Challenge Cup Final during the 1947–48 season at Wembley Stadium, London on Saturday 1 May 1948, and played, and was man of the match winning the Lance Todd Trophy in Bradford Northern's 12–0 victory over Halifax in the 1948–49 Challenge Cup Final during the 1948–49 season at Wembley Stadium, London on Saturday 7 May 1949.

Bradford Northern played in five of the six Challenge Cup finals between 1944 and 1949, the first two finals; the 1943–44 Challenge Cup Final against Wigan, and the 1944–45 Challenge Cup Final against Huddersfield were played over two-legs, five Bradford Northern players played in all five of these finals, they were; Eric Batten, Vic Darlison, Donald Ward, Ernest Ward, and Frank Whitcombe.

County Cup Final appearances
Ernest Ward played in Bradford Northern's 5–2 victory over Wakefield Trinity in the 1945–46 Yorkshire County Cup Final during the 1945–46 season at Thrum Hall, Halifax on Saturday 3 November 1945, played left-, i.e. number 4, in the 18–9 victory over Castleford in the 1948–49 Yorkshire County Cup Final during the 1948–49 season at Headingley Rugby Stadium, Leeds on Saturday 30 October 1948, and played left-, i.e. number 4, and scored 4-conversions in the 11–4 victory over Huddersfield in the 1949–50 Yorkshire County Cup Final during the 1949–50 season at Headingley Rugby Stadium, Leeds on Saturday 29 October 1949.

Other notable matches
Ernest Ward played  for Northern Command XIII against a Rugby League XIII at Thrum Hall, Halifax on Saturday 21 March 1942.

Coaching career

Club career
Ernest Ward was the coach of Castleford, his first game in charge was on Saturday 7 November 1953, and his last game in charge was on Saturday 7 April 1956.

Honoured at Bradford
Ernest Ward, has been included in Bradford's; 'Millennium Masters', 'Bull Masters', and in August 2007 he was named in the 'Team of the Century'. Only six players have been included in all three lists, they are; Karl Fairbank, Trevor Foster, James Lowes, Keith Mumby, Robbie Paul, and Ernest Ward.

Genealogical information
Ernest Ward was the younger brother of the rugby league footballer; Donald Ward.

Note
In some references the Wales international statistics of Edward H. "Ted" Ward are misallocated to Ernest Ward.

References

External links
Statistics at rugbyleagueproject.org (Ted Ward's Wales statistics misallocated to Ernest Ward, Ernest Ward's Combined Nationalities, and some England statistics are missing)
Statistics at rugbyleagueproject.org (Ernest Ward's missing Combined Nationalities, and England statistics)
(archived by web.archive.org) The Millennium Masters – Backs
(archived by web.archive.org) Bull Masters – Ernest Ward
(archived by web.archive.org) Team Of The Century
Photograph 'Challenge cup winning side.' at rlhp.co.uk
Photograph 'Championship winning team 1945' at rlhp.co.uk
Photograph 'Ernest Ward is presented with the Yorkshire Cup in 1945' at rlhp.co.uk
Photograph 'Trevor and Ernest 1946' at rlhp.co.uk
Photograph 'Touring quartet' at rlhp.co.uk
Photograph 'The 1947 Team' at rlhp.co.uk
Photograph 'Wembley 1947' at rlhp.co.uk
Photograph 'Ernest Ward holds the Cup aloft' at rlhp.co.uk
Photograph '1948 Championship Semi-final' at rlhp.co.uk
Photograph 'Northern at Fartown' at rlhp.co.uk
Photograph 'Trevor Foster about to release the ball at Wembley, 1949' at rlhp.co.uk
Photograph 'England v Wales 1950' at rlhp.co.uk
Photograph 'Trevor Foster with Ernest Ward' at rlhp.co.uk
Photograph 'Four Northern Greats' at rlhp.co.uk
Photograph 'Ernest Ward holds the Championship Trophy' at rlhp.co.uk
Photograph 'Keith Mumby Presentation' at rlhp.co.uk
Photograph 'Northern Greats' at rlhp.co.uk

1920 births
1987 deaths
Army XIII rugby league players
Bradford Bulls captains
Bradford Bulls players
British Army personnel of World War II
British Army soldiers
Castleford Tigers coaches
Castleford Tigers players
Combined Nationalities rugby league team players
England national rugby league team captains
England national rugby league team players
English rugby league coaches
English rugby league players
Great Britain national rugby league team captains
Great Britain national rugby league team players
Lance Todd Trophy winners
Northern Command XIII rugby league team players
Place of death missing
Rugby league centres
Rugby league fullbacks
Rugby league players from Dewsbury
Rugby league second-rows